The Confederation of Chilean Students (Spanish: Confederación de Estudiantes de Chile, CONFECH) is a student organization in Chile that congregates the student federations of universities in Chile.

It was established on October 23, 1984 in Valparaiso.

Structure 
The CONFECH brings together students from the universities in Chile, which are organized in democratically elected federations. It is the only student organization with a national character and it has been in existence for over ten years.

Member federations 
The independent federations that form part of CONFECH include:

State universities 
 Feut (Universidad de Tarapacá)
 Fedeunap (Universidad Arturo Prat)
 Feua (Universidad de Antofagasta)
 Feuda (Universidad de Atacama)
 Feuls (Universidad de La Serena)
 Feuv (Universidad de Valparaíso)
 Feupla (Universidad de Playa Ancha)
 FECH (Universidad de Chile)
 Feusach (Universidad de Santiago de Chile)
 Fep (Universidad Metropolitana de Ciencias de la Educación)
 Feutem (Universidad Tecnológica Metropolitana)
 Fedeut (Universidad de Talca)
 Feubb (Universidad del Bío-Bío)
 Feufro (Universidad de La Frontera)
 Feula (Universidad de Los Lagos)
 Feum (Universidad de Magallanes)

Private universities 
 Feucn (Universidad Católica del Norte)
 Fepucv (Pontificia Universidad Católica de Valparaíso)
 Feutfsm (Universidad Técnica Federico Santa María)
 Feuc (Pontificia Universidad Católica de Chile)
 Feucen (Universidad Central de Chile)
 Feucm (Universidad Católica del Maule)
 Fec (Universidad de Concepción)
 Feucsc (Universidad Católica de la Santísima Concepción)
 Feuach (Universidad Austral de Chile)

Indigenous 
 FEMAE (Mapuche Student Federation)

See also 
Education in Chile
2011 Chilean protests 

Students' unions
Student organisations based in Chile